C. V. Mathew is a bishop of the St. Thomas Evangelical Church of India. Previously he was the Presiding Bishop of the St. Thomas Evangelical Church of India from 2008-2018. He retired on 31st December.

Mathew's area of specialisation is in religions, Hindu fundamentalism, and a Christian response.  Mathew was consecrated as the presiding bishop on 28 November 2008 along with Bishop Dr Thomas Abraham.

Career

 Priest of St. Thomas Evangelical Church of India
 Episcopal 
 Presiding Bishop of St. Thomas Evangelical Church of India from 2008-2018.
 President Bible Society of India - Kerala Auxiliary
 Chairman of the Evangelical Fellowship of India - the grouping of all evangelical churches, organisations and ministries in the country.
 Director of World Vision international Asia Pacific Region
 Deputy Chairman of the Lausanne Committee of world Evangelization
 Principal of Jubilee Memorial Bible College, Chennai.
 Academic Dean, Union Biblical Seminary - India's largest evangelical seminary.
He has also served as the Vicar of different parishes of the St Thomas Evangelical church of India.

Writings
 Area of Light: The Indian Church and Modernisation by Charles Corwin, C. V. Mathew. Hardcover, ISPCK,  (81-7214-166-1)
 Jubilee Reflections: Essays on Selected Theological Issues by C.V. Mathew. Softcover, Indian Society for Promoting Christian Knowledge, The,  (81-7214-591-8) Mission in Context:
 Missiological Reflections Essays in Honour of Roger E. Hedlund and June Hedlund by I.S.P.C.K. (Organization), Roger E. Hedlund, Mylapore Institute for Indigenous Studies, C. V. Mathew, June Hedlund. Hardcover, MIIS/ISPCK,  (81-7214-722-8)
 The Saffron Mission: A Historical Analysis of Modern Hindu Missionary Ideologies and Practices by C. V. Mathew. Hardcover, Indian Society for Promoting Christian Knowledge,  (81-7214-537-3)

Past students
During the stint at the Union Biblical Seminary, Pune, C. V. Mathew's students included Jonadob Nathaniel, the current Director, Translations of the Bible Society of India and B. Samuel Raja Sekhar, the current Auxiliary Secretary of the Bible Society of India Andhra Pradesh Auxiliary.

References

External links
St. Thomas Evangelical Church of India

Living people
Indian bishops
Year of birth missing (living people)
Academic staff of Union Biblical Seminary, Pune